Man-seok (pronounced ) is a Korean masculine given name. Its meaning differs based on the hanja used to write each syllable of the name. There are 19 hanja with the reading "man" and 20 hanja with the reading "seok" on the South Korean government's official list of hanja which may be registered for use in given names.

People with this name include:
Oh Man-seok (born 1975), South Korean actor

Fictional characters with this name include:
Man-seok, in 1993 South Korean film I Will Survive
Man-seok, in 2010 South Korean film The Man from Nowhere
Kim Man-seok, in 2011 South Korean film Late Blossom
Go Man-seok, in 2013 South Korean television series Two Weeks
Choi Man-seok, in 2014 South Korean television series High School King of Savvy

See also
List of Korean given names

References

Korean masculine given names